October 18 - Eastern Orthodox liturgical calendar - October 20

All fixed commemorations below celebrated on November 1 by Orthodox Churches on the Old Calendar.

For October 19th, Orthodox Churches on the Old Calendar commemorate the Saints listed on October 6.

Saints
 Prophet Joel (800 BC)
 Saint Mnason of Tamassos, Cyprus, the early disciple, mentioned in Acts 21:15-16  (see also: October 18 )
 Hieromartyr Felix the Presbyter and Eusebius the Deacon, by the sword.
 Martyrs Varus (Ouarus) and six (seven) others with him, in Egypt (c. 307)  (see also: February 28)
 Blessed Cleopatra (327) and her son John (320), in Egypt.
 Hieromartyr Sadoc (Sadoth), Bishop of Persia, and 120 martyrs with him (342)
 Saint Leontius the Philosopher, of St. Sabbas Monastery (624)
Saint Prochorus of Pechenga (Pchinja), Abbot, in the Vranski Desert on the Pchinja river (10th century)

Pre-Schism Western saints
 Martyrs Ptolemy and Lucius, martyrs in Rome under Antoninus Pius (c. 165)
 Saint Altinus (Attinus), founder of the churches of Orléans and Chartres in France and perhaps a martyr (4th century)
 Saint Eusterius, fourth Bishop of Salerno in Italy (5th century)
 Saint Lupus of Soissons, a nephew of St Remi of Rheims who became Bishop of Soissons (c. 540)
 Saint Veranus of Cavaillon, Bishop of Cavaillon (590)
 Saint Ethbin, monk, then hermit near Kildare, Ireland (c. 600)
 Saint Aquilinus of Évreux, Bishop of Evreux, Confessor (695)
 Saint Desiderius, a monk at Lonrey and a disciple of St Sigiranus, he became a hermit in La Brenne near Bourges, France (c. 705)
 Saint Theofrid (Theofroy, Chaifre), Abbot of Carmery-en-Velay (Monastier-Saint-Chaffre), martyred by invading Saracens (728)
 Saint Frideswide of Oxford, Royal Abbess, patron saint of Oxford (c. 735)
 Saint Laura of Cordoba, a nun at Santa María de Cuteclara de Córdoba, martyred by the Moors by being thrown into a cauldron of molten lead (864)
 Saint Eadnoth the Younger (Ednoth, Eadnot), successively Abbot of Ramsey and Bishop of Dorchester (1016)

Post-Schism Orthodox saints
 New Monk-martyr Nicholas Dvali of Jerusalem (1314)  (see also: February 12 )
 Saint Gabriel, Archimandrite (Abbot) of St. Elias Skete, Mount Athos (1901)
 Righteous John of Kronstadt, Wonderworker (1908) (see also December 20)
 Saint Anthony (Abashidze), Schema-Archbishop, of the Kyiv Caves Lavra (1942)

New Martys and Confessors
 New Hieromartyr Alexis Stavrovsky, Priest, of Petrograd (1918)
 New Hieromartyr Sergius Pokrovsky, Priest (1937)

Other commemorations
 First translation (1187) of the relics of Venerable John of Rila, founder of Rila Monastery in Bulgaria (946)
 Synaxis of the icon of "Panagia Vasilissa" ("Panagia the Queen"), in Mouzaki, Karditsa, Greece.

Icon gallery

Notes

References

Sources 
 October 19 / November 1. Orthodox Calendar (PRAVOSLAVIE.RU).
 November 1 / October 19. HOLY TRINITY RUSSIAN ORTHODOX CHURCH (A parish of the Patriarchate of Moscow).
 October 19. OCA - The Lives of the Saints.
 The Autonomous Orthodox Metropolia of Western Europe and the Americas (ROCOR). St. Hilarion Calendar of Saints for the year of our Lord 2004. St. Hilarion Press (Austin, TX). p. 78.
 The Nineteenth Day of the Month of October. Orthodoxy in China.
 October 19. Latin Saints of the Orthodox Patriarchate of Rome.
 The Roman Martyrology. Transl. by the Archbishop of Baltimore. Last Edition, According to the Copy Printed at Rome in 1914. Revised Edition, with the Imprimatur of His Eminence Cardinal Gibbons. Baltimore: John Murphy Company, 1916. pp. 322–323.
 Rev. Richard Stanton. A Menology of England and Wales, or, Brief Memorials of the Ancient British and English Saints Arranged According to the Calendar, Together with the Martyrs of the 16th and 17th Centuries. London: Burns & Oates, 1892. pp. 503–507.
Greek Sources
 Great Synaxaristes:  19 ΟΚΤΩΒΡΙΟΥ. ΜΕΓΑΣ ΣΥΝΑΞΑΡΙΣΤΗΣ.
  Συναξαριστής. 19 Οκτωβρίου. ECCLESIA.GR. (H ΕΚΚΛΗΣΙΑ ΤΗΣ ΕΛΛΑΔΟΣ).
  19/10/2017. Ορθόδοξος Συναξαριστής. 
Russian Sources
  1 ноября (19 октября). Православная Энциклопедия под редакцией Патриарха Московского и всея Руси Кирилла (электронная версия). (Orthodox Encyclopedia - Pravenc.ru).
  19 октября по старому стилю / 1 ноября по новому стилю. Русская Православная Церковь - Православный церковный календарь на 2016 год.

October in the Eastern Orthodox calendar